D421 is a state road connecting D66 state road to Bršica terminal of the Port of Rijeka.

The road, as well as all other state roads in Croatia, is managed and maintained by Hrvatske ceste, state owned company.

Road junctions and populated areas

Sources

State roads in Croatia
Transport in Istria County